Cricket has been a sport at the modern Summer Olympic Games. The only time it has been played to date was at the 1900 Summer Olympics with only a men's contest, and Great Britain won the gold medal, but the possibility of it being recontested at the Olympics has recently resurfaced.

Inclusion

Cricket was originally scheduled to be included in the inaugural 1896 Summer Olympics, which were held in Athens; cricket would have been the only team sport held at the Games. There were, however, insufficient entries and so no event was held.

The event was held at the 1900 Summer Olympics in Paris four years later but only two countries competed, Great Britain and hosts France. The French team was mostly represented by English expatriates, and it is officially considered a mixed team while the English team was represented by Devon & Somerset Wanderers Cricket Club, so was not nationally selected. It is considered that few of the participants would have been good enough to play first-class cricket — only the British side had experience of eight such games in its side through Somerset's Montagu Toller and Alfred Bowerman.

The match was played over two days with both 12-a-side teams batting two innings each and did not attract first-class status. England won the match by 158 runs to win the gold medal. If the French had held out for five more minutes the game would have been declared a draw. Knowledge of the game would have been lost but for the forethought of John Symes, a member of the victorious team, who kept a scorecard in his own writing.

A cricket tournament was scheduled for 1904 Summer Olympics held in St. Louis but was eventually cancelled.

Possible reintroduction

Cricket's governing bodies have, for much of their recent history, been unwilling or reluctant to return to the Olympics. 

In particular, the Board of Control for Cricket in India (BCCI) and the England and Wales Cricket Board (ECB), considered cricket's two most powerful national governing bodies, have long been opposed. 

More recently, the prospect of a return to the Olympics for cricket has become more likely. In March 2017, it was reported that International Cricket Council chief Dave Richardson thought the "time is right" for Olympic cricket. It has been reported that the opposition of the BCCI to cricket at the Olympics has softened.

The likely format would be Twenty20 cricket, the shortest of the three formats of the game established at international level. It has been suggested that inclusion of the sport at the Commonwealth Games could be a springboard for inclusion in the Olympic Games. It was previously an event at the 1998 Commonwealth Games in Kuala Lumpur, Malaysia.

Three leading international cricket teams - England, Ireland and the West Indies - do not correspond to Olympic national teams, a problem also faced in rugby and association football. 

The United Kingdom competes at the Olympics as Great Britain with athletes from England, Scotland, Wales and those British Overseas Territories without their own Olympic team, while athletes from Northern Ireland can choose to represent either Great Britain or Ireland. In cricket, Scotland has its own team, Welsh players play for the England team, and the Ireland team represents the Republic and Northern Ireland together. Great Britain may feature players eligible some ICC associates teams like Falkland Islands, Gibraltar, Guernsey, Isle of Man, Jersey, Scotland and Turks and Caicos Islands.

In rugby, Team GB have to nominate one Home Nations team whose results will be used to determine whether Great Britain as a whole qualifies for the Olympics, but players from all the Home Nations can play for the combined team according to the usual Olympic rules.

The West Indies cricket team covers much of the Caribbean, which has twelve Olympic associations: Antigua and Barbuda, Barbados, British Virgin Islands, Dominica, Grenada, Guyana, Jamaica, Saint Lucia, Saint Vincent and the Grenadines, Saint Kitts and Nevis, Trinidad and Tobago and United States Virgin Islands. Athletes from dependent territories without an Olympic association can represent the "mother country" without affecting their affiliations in other events. 

Thus, West Indies cricketers from Anguilla and Montserrat would be eligible for Great Britain at the Olympics, and those from Sint Maarten would represent the Netherlands.

In May 2020, Eoin Morgan, the white ball captain of the England cricket team, supported the idea of using the T10 cricket format at the Olympics. In October 2020, USA Cricket stated that it saw a proposed inclusion of cricket in the 2028 Summer Olympics in Los Angeles as a long-term goal.

In 2020, the BCCI in its Annual General Meeting decided to back the ICC's bid for inclusion of cricket, in the T20 format, in the 2028 Los Angeles Olympics after getting some clarifications from the International Olympic Committee. "The General Body also decided to seek further clarification from the ICC on their proposal to include cricket in the 2028 Los Angeles Olympics", Secretary of BCCI Jay Shah said. 

In August 2021, the ICC confirmed its plans to bid for the inclusion of cricket at the Olympics, starting with the 2028 Summer Olympics and the 2032 Summer Olympics.

Men

Results

Participating nations

Medalists

Venues

References

 
Discontinued sports at the Summer Olympics
Olympic Games